Ligeria angusticornis is a European species of fly in the family Tachinidae.

References

Insects described in 1847
Diptera of Europe
Exoristinae
Taxa named by Hermann Loew